Ballet continued to be an significant part of the Edinburgh International Festival during the third decade of the festival. However, in a period which saw increased concerts, staged operas, dramas and exhibitions, there was actually a reduction in the number of ballet companies coming to the festival, from 19 in 1957–1966 to 12 in 1967–1976.

Also relatively fewer performances were at the Empire Theatre, with the smaller King's Theatre, Lyceum Theatre, and Church Hill Theatre all being used as alternative venues.

List

See also
Edinburgh International Festival
Ballet at the Edinburgh International Festival: history and repertoire, 1947–1956
Ballet at the Edinburgh International Festival: history and repertoire, 1957–1966
Opera at the Edinburgh International Festival: history and repertoire, 1947–1956
Opera at the Edinburgh International Festival: history and repertoire, 1957–1966
Opera at the Edinburgh International Festival: history and repertoire, 1967–1976
Drama at the Edinburgh International Festival: history and repertoire, 1947–1956
Drama at the Edinburgh International Festival: history and repertoire, 1957–1966
Musicians at the Edinburgh International Festival, 1947 to 1956
Musicians at the Edinburgh International Festival, 1957–1966
Visual Arts at the Edinburgh International Festival, 1947–1976
World premieres at the Edinburgh International Festival

References

Edinburgh Festival
Annual events in Edinburgh
Ballet-related lists